Johann Mayringer (28 June 1887 – 22 January 1961) was an Austrian footballer. He played in three matches for the Austria national football team from 1910 to 1911.

References

External links
 

1887 births
1961 deaths
Austrian footballers
Austria international footballers
Place of birth missing
Association footballers not categorized by position